Frederickson is a census-designated place (CDP) in Pierce County, Washington, United States. The population was 24,906 at the 2020 census.

Geography
Frederickson is located at  (47.076729, -122.346339).

According to the United States Census Bureau, the CDP has a total area of 7.3 square miles (19.0 km2), of which, 7.3 square miles (18.9 km2) of it is land and 0.04 square miles (0.1 km2) of it (0.41%) is water.

According to the Frederickson Community Plan published by Pierce County (May 1, 2003) Frederickson's total area is 8,003 acres or 12.5 square miles.

Demographics

2000 census
As of the census of 2000, there were 5,758 people, 1,877 households, and 1,542 families residing in the CDP. The population density was 789.6 people per square mile (305.0/km2). There were 1,963 housing units at an average density of 269.2/sq mi (104.0/km2). The racial makeup of the CDP was 84.40% White, 3.18% African American, 1.56% Native American, 3.66% Asian, 0.85% Pacific Islander, 1.60% from other races, and 4.74% from two or more races. Hispanic or Latino of any race were 4.46% of the population.

There were 1,877 households, out of which 46.1% had children under the age of 18 living with them, 69.0% were married couples living together, 8.6% had a female householder with no husband present, and 17.8% were non-families. 12.8% of all households were made up of individuals, and 3.8% had someone living alone who was 65 years of age or older. The average household size was 3.03 and the average family size was 3.28.

In the CDP, the population was spread out, with 31.1% under the age of 18, 7.1% from 18 to 24, 35.2% from 25 to 44, 20.0% from 45 to 64, and 6.7% who were 65 years of age or older. The median age was 32 years. For every 100 females, there were 107.8 males. For every 100 females age 18 and over, there were 107.1 males.

The median income for a household in the CDP was $56,862, and the median income for a family was $57,060. Males had a median income of $41,439 versus $28,690 for females. The per capita income for the CDP was $19,385. About 5.8% of families and 7.4% of the population were below the poverty line, including 9.8% of those under age 18 and 14.3% of those age 65 or over.

Education
Public schools in Frederickson are part of the Bethel School District. Schools in or near Frederickson include:

 Elementary Schools:
 Clover Creek Elementary School
 Frederickson Elementary School
 Naches Trail Elementary School
 Junior High Schools:
 Bethel Junior High School
 Liberty Junior High School
 High Schools:
 Graham-Kapowsin High School
 Spanaway Lake High School
 Private school:
 Bethel Baptist Christian School (grades K4-12)
 Nearby colleges:
 Pacific Lutheran University (Parkland)
 Colleges in Tacoma
 Colleges in Lakewood
 Colleges in Puyallup
 Colleges offering classes at Joint Base Lewis-McChord''

Surrounding community

References

Census-designated places in Pierce County, Washington
Census-designated places in Washington (state)